Asthenoptycha heminipha is a species of moth of the family Tortricidae. It is found in Australia, where it has been recorded from Queensland.

The wingspan is 14–17 mm. The forewings are brown, strigulated (finely streaked) with dark fuscous and with some whitish irroration (speckling) towards the dorsum. The hindwings are grey.

References

Moths described in 1916
Epitymbiini
Moths of Australia